Belomitra quadruplex is a species of sea snail, a marine gastropod mollusc in the family Belomitridae, the whelks.

Description
The shell size varies between 10 mm and 41 mm

Distribution
This species is distributed in European waters, the Atlantic Ocean off the Azores and off New England, USA

References

 Locard, A., 1897 Mollusques testacés. In: Expéditions scientifiques du Travailleur et du Talisman pendant les années 1880, 1881, 1882, 1883, vol. 1, p. 516 p, 22 pls
 Bouchet P. & Warén A. (1985). Revision of the Northeast Atlantic bathyal and abyssal Neogastropoda excluding Turridae (Mollusca, Gastropoda). Bollettino Malacologico Suppl. 1: 121-296

External links
  Serge GOFAS, Ángel A. LUQUE, Joan Daniel OLIVER,José TEMPLADO & Alberto SERRA (2021) - The Mollusca of Galicia Bank (NE Atlantic Ocean); European Journal of Taxonomy 785: 1–114
 MNHN, Paris: Belomitra quadruplex (holotype)

Belomitridae
Gastropods described in 1882